The Cycling Tournament at the 1983 Summer Universiade took place in Edmonton, Alberta (Canada) in July 1983. Cycling was included in the Summer Universiade programme as an optional sport. There were 12 cycling events; 8 for track cycling and 4 for road cycling. The venue for track cycling was the Argyll Velodrome. The finish of the road races were in Hawerlark Park.

Events

Track time trials
In the afternoon competition on 4 July under the sun at the Argyll Velodrome, two cyclists from the Soviet Union won men's and women's 1 km time trial. Aleksandr Panfilov took the men's event in 1:06.874 seconds, 1.015 sec ahead of the silver medalist Stefano Baudino from Italy and 1.1667 sec faster than Andris Zelch-Lotchmelis of the Soviet Union. In the women's time trial Erika Salumäe of the USSR captured the gold with a time of 1:14.554. Isabelle Nicoloso of France, who was 1.316 seconds slower, won the silver medal and Soviet Nadezhda Kibardina finished third.

Women's road race
The team of the Soviet Union rode with their team throughout the race very strong. At the end there was a front group of three riders, two from the Soviet Union (Nadezhda Kibardina and Tamara Poliakova) and  Jeannie Longo from France. On the finish in Hawerlark Park Kibardina won the sprint ahead of Poliakova and Longo.

Medalists

Medal table

Road cycling

Track cycling

References

Cycling at the Summer Universiade
1983 in road cycling
1983 Summer Universiade
1983 in track cycling
1983 in cycle racing